Antonio Maceda Francés (born 16 May 1957) is a Spanish retired footballer. Though a central defender, he was known for his goal-scoring ability.

He started his career at Sporting de Gijón and finished it with Real Madrid, where he was greatly hampered by injuries.

Maceda won nearly 40 caps for Spain, and represented the nation at two World Cups and Euro 1984.

Club career
Maceda was born in Sagunto, Province of Valencia, and played for Sporting de Gijón and Real Madrid during his career. In his second professional year, he contributed with 11 matches to the Asturians final runner-up position in La Liga, and became a defensive stalwart in the subsequent seasons.

After scoring nine league goals in his last two years combined (61 matches), Maceda earned himself a transfer to giants Real Madrid, and netted five times in his debut campaign, which ended with a league/UEFA Cup conquest. However, after a freak injury with the national side, he was forced to retire in 1988 at only 31, amassing Spanish top flight totals of 223 games and 24 goals.

Maceda served a stint as a radio commentator subsequently, then took up coaching, most notably with his first club, being one of four managers in 1997–98 as Sporting ranked last with an all-time low 13 points.

International career
Maceda earned 36 caps and scored eight goals for the Spain national team, and played in three major tournaments: the 1982 FIFA World Cup, UEFA Euro 1984 (during the qualifying stages, he contributed with two in the decisive and historical 12–1 routing of Malta) and the 1986 World Cup.

In Euro 84, played in France, Maceda headed the winning goal in the 89th minute against a then-invincible West Germany side who were also defending European champions, sending the country to the semifinals against an up-and-coming Denmark – where he also scored – in an eventual penalty shootout success. He missed the final against France, due to suspension.

Maceda retired from international play following the 1986 World Cup, after a serious injury. He had made his debut on 25 March 1981 in a friendly 1–2 win in England, the first time Spain won at Wembley Stadium.

International goals

Honours

Club
Real Madrid
La Liga: 1985–86, 1986–87, 1987–88
UEFA Cup: 1985–86

International
Spain
UEFA European Championship: Runner-up 1984

References

External links

1957 births
Living people
People from Sagunto
Sportspeople from the Province of Valencia
Spanish footballers
Footballers from the Valencian Community
Association football defenders
La Liga players
Segunda División players
Sporting de Gijón B players
Sporting de Gijón players
Real Madrid CF players
Spain under-21 international footballers
Spain under-23 international footballers
Spain B international footballers
Spain international footballers
1982 FIFA World Cup players
UEFA Euro 1984 players
1986 FIFA World Cup players
Spanish football managers
La Liga managers
Segunda División managers
CD Badajoz managers
Sporting de Gijón managers
SD Compostela managers
UEFA Cup winning players